"All I Need" is a song by English alternative rock band Radiohead, produced by Nigel Godrich. It was released as a promotional single on 5 January 2009, from their seventh studio album, In Rainbows (2007). "All I Need" is a downbeat track which sees frontman Thom Yorke singing of obsession and unrequited love.

In support of the MTV EXIT anti-human trafficking campaign, Radiohead released a music video for "All I Need", directed by Steve Rogers, which premiered on May 1, 2008. The video, which contrasts the lives of two boys from different economic backgrounds, received acclaim and won numerous awards.

Recording
Radiohead debuted "All I Need" at their 20 June 2006 performance at the Auditorium Theatre in Chicago, Illinois. Singer Thom Yorke told the audience that they had just "sketched [the song] out earlier and might get it wrong".

Radiohead recorded "All I Need" for their seventh studio album, In Rainbows (2007). They used a fan recording of the debut performance, uploaded to YouTube, as a reference when working in the studio; Yorke said: "It's all crunchy, it's all from mobile phone but... that's sort of an element of it I really find incredibly exciting."

Guitarist Jonny Greenwood wanted to capture the sensation of white noise generated by "a band playing loudly in a room, when all this chaos kicks up". Unable to produce the sound in a recording studio, Greenwood instead had a string section, the Millennia Ensemble, play every note of the scale, blanketing the audio frequencies. He also overdubbed his own viola playing.

Guitarist Ed O'Brien used a guitar strung with four bottom E strings, creating a "thicker" sound, combined with a sustain unit (allowing notes to be sustained indefinitely) and delay pedal. Yorke said that the final version of "All I Need" was a combination of four different recordings.

Composition
"All I Need" is a sombre song with lyrics detailing obsession and love. It incorporates strings, synthesisers, glockenspiel and piano. Brian Howe of Paste wrote that it "contrasts baggy bass bleats with tiny, concise glockenspiel". Robert Sandall of The Telegraph described it as Yorke's most "direct love song", and Rolling Stone cited it as among "the most intense love songs [he] has ever sung".

Yorke's lyrics incorporate metaphors describing unrequited love, describing himself as "an animal trapped in your hot car". In the final crescendo, the album's "most cathartic release", Yorke sings "it's all right, it's all wrong" as drummer Philip Selway's crash cymbals enter.

Release
"All I Need" concludes the first half of In Rainbows. On 5 January 2009, TBD Records and ATO Records released "All I Need" to United States adult album alternative radio, marking the fifth and final single from In Rainbows. CD copies of the single were distributed by TBD Records for promotional purposes to coincide with the radio release, which included labels detailing Radiohead's nominations at the 51st Annual Grammy Awards. A performance of "All I Need" was included on the 2008 live video In Rainbows – From the Basement. Yorke remixed "All I Need" as a new song, "Honey Pot", which he played during a guest appearance on the radio station KCRW in June 2013.

Music video
Radiohead produced the music video for "All I Need" with MTV in support of the MTV EXIT campaign, which promotes awareness and increase prevention of human trafficking and modern slavery. Yorke said of the project:

The video, directed by Steve Rogers and filmed in Australia by cinematographer John Seale, premiered on May 1, 2008. In split screen, it depicts a day in the lives of two children from opposite sides of the world: a boy in the west from an affluent area, and a boy in the east forced to work in a sweatshop which produces shoes worn by the western boy. The video garnered 16 awards, including the UNICEF–CASBAA Asia-Pacific Child Rights Award, the Bronze ANDY for Film at the International Andy Awards, the In Book for Music Video at the 2009 D&AD Awards, and the Bronze Lion for Film at the Cannes Lions International Festival of Creativity.

Reception 
Thomas Leatham of Far Out name "All I Need" the third-best Radiohead song.

Personnel
Credits adapted from the In Rainbows liner notes.

Radiohead
 Thom Yorke 
 Jonny Greenwood 
 Colin Greenwood 
 Ed O'Brien 
 Philip Selway 

Additional personnel
 Nigel Godrich – production, mixing, engineering
 Dan Grech-Marguerat – engineering
 Bob Ludwig – mastering
 The Millennia Ensemble – strings
 Hugo Nicolson – engineering
 Graeme Stewart – preproduction
 Richard Woodcraft – engineering

References

2009 singles
2007 songs
Radiohead songs
Songs written by Thom Yorke
Songs written by Colin Greenwood
Songs written by Jonny Greenwood
Songs written by Philip Selway
Songs written by Ed O'Brien